The electromagnetic dawn chorus is a phenomenon that occurs most often at or shortly after dawn local time. With the proper radio equipment, dawn chorus can be converted to sounds that resemble birds' dawn chorus (by coincidence).

The electromagnetic dawn chorus is believed to be generated by a Doppler-shifted cyclotron interaction between anisotropic distributions of energetic (> 40 keV) electrons and ambient background VLF noise. These energetic electrons are generally injected into the inner magnetosphere at the onset of the substorm expansion phase. Dawn choruses occur more frequently during magnetic storms.

This phenomenon also occurs during aurorae, when it is termed an auroral chorus.

See also
Auroral chorus
Hiss (electromagnetic)
Whistler (radio)
Cluster One, a Pink Floyd track using sferics and dawn chorus as an overture

Notes

Further reading

External links

Natural VLF Radio - Sounds of Space Weather

2018 recording by NASA RBSP (Radiation Belt Storm Probe)

Electrical phenomena
Geomagnetism